Anadolu University is a public university in Eskişehir, Turkey. The university is known for its success in verbal fields such as history and communication. Its Faculty of Communication Sciences is sometimes considered the best in Turkey. The campus is named after Yunus Emre.

History 
Anadolu University was established in 1982 from the union of four existing higher education institutes in Eskişehir: the Academy of Economics and Commercial Sciences of Eskişehir, the State Academy of Architecture and Engineering, the Institute of Education, and a medical school. As the Academy of Economics and Commercial Sciences was founded earliest (in 1958), Anadolu University has adopted that year as their date of establishment.

Campus 
Most of Anadolu University's faculties and schools, including the Open Education Faculty, are located at the Yunusemre Campus in the centre of Eskişehir. The Yunusemre Campus also contains student housing, Anadolu's university hospital, and most of the university's administration buildings.

To serve its distance education students, Anadolu University operates 88 administrative centres, or bureaus, in urban areas throughout Turkey, many of which offer academic counselling and optional evening classes.

Distance education
The Higher Education Act of 1981 nominated Anadolu University as the national provider of distance education, upon which it has placed strong emphasis since its creation in 1982. The university's goal is to educate Turks who live in rural areas and others "who do not have the time or resources to enroll in conventional schools." This effort has been largely successful, as enrollment in open education programs has increased from under 30,000 in 1982-83 to over 870,000 in 2005-06 and is now also available to Turkish communities in Northern Cyprus and the European Union.

Programs offered via distance education include 4-year Bachelor of Arts (B.A.) degrees in Economics and in Business Administration and nineteen 2-year associate degrees in a variety of fields. Anadolu University has received a mandate from the Turkish Ministry of National Education to educate Turkey's preschool and English language teachers and does so by distance education, though students in the latter program are also required to take two years of in-person classes.

Anadolu University and SUNY Empire State College offered distance education eMBA degree from 2005 to 2010.

Courses are delivered by a variety of methods, including pre-recorded television and radio broadcasts, videoconferences, and via internet. Students can also access academic counseling or attend optional evening classes at some of the Anadolu University bureaus located throughout Turkey.

Faculties and schools

Faculties
 Distance Education Faculty
 Faculty of Pharmacy
 Faculty of Humanities
 Faculty of Education
 Faculty of Science
 Faculty of Fine Arts
 Faculty of Law
 Faculty of Economics and Administrative Sciences
 Faculty of Economics
 Faculty of Communication Sciences
 Faculty of Business Administration
 Faculty of Engineering
 Faculty of Design and Architecture
 Faculty of Aeronautics and Astronautics

Schools 
 School of Physical Education and Sports
 School of Music and Drama
 School of Industrial Arts
 School for the Handicapped
 School of Tourism and Hotel Management (faculty since earlier 2012)
 School of Foreign Languages
 State Conservatory

Vocational schools 
 Eskisehir Vocational School
 Bozüyük Vocational School
 Bilecik Vocational School
 Porsuk Vocational School

Affiliations
The university is a member of European Universities Association.

Notable alumni
 Yılmaz Büyükerşen - Metropolitan Mayor of Eskişehir, former rector of Anadolu University
 Fethi Heper - Football player
 Pelin Karahan - Actress
 Ayşe Hatun Önal - Model, Actress, Singer-Songwriter
 Beyazıt Öztürk - Television Personality, Standup Comedian and Actor
 Levent Üzümcü - Actor
 Nurgül Yeşilçay - Actress
Sara Kaya, Politician, former mayor of Nusaybin

Honorary doctorates
 Sakıp Sabancı, 1984 
 Turgut Özakman, 1998
 Ali Erdemir, 1998

References

External links

 Anadolu University Website

 
Educational institutions established in 1958
Buildings and structures in Eskişehir
1958 establishments in Turkey